Białogórzyno  (German: Bulgrin) is a village in the administrative district of Gmina Białogard, within Białogard County, West Pomeranian Voivodeship, in north-western Poland. As of the census of 2011, the village has population of 400.

See also
History of Pomerania

References

Villages in Białogard County